The fourth season of The Voice of Vietnam began on 12 February 2017. Thu Minh returned for her second season as a coach, while former Vietnam Idol Kids judge Tóc Tiên, The Voice Kids judges Noo Phước Thịnh and Đông Nhi joined the show, replacing Đàm Vĩnh Hưng, Thu Phương, Mỹ Tâm and Tuấn Hưng. This season marks the first time in any franchise of The Voice worldwide to have 3 female coaches and only one male coach.

This season is hosted by Nguyên Khang, former host of The X Factor Vietnam.

Ali Hoàng Dương won the competition on June 4, 2017, and Thu Minh became the winning coach for the second time.

Coaches and hosts

After the finals of The Voice of Vietnam season 3, Tuấn Hưng announced that he would not be returning for season 4 . In 2016, the show was not renewed for season 4 to make room for season 2 of The X Factor Vietnam. Coach Đàm Vĩnh Hưng announced in 2016 that he would not return to judge any talent show for a period of time, thus ruled himself out of the show. By the end of 2016 rumors stated that Đông Nhi would become a coach for the show's fourth season, after winning the Best Asian Artist Award of MTV EMA 2016 as well as season 4 of The Voice Kids. In December 2016, Noo Phước Thịnh's manager stated that he had just signed a new contract to judge a new "big" show, which arose rumors that he would join The Voice as a coach, after judging The Voice Kids. Hồ Ngọc Hà, an original coach, was also rumored to be returning to the show.  Ending all rumors, on 4th January 2017 it was confirmed that the coaches for season 4 are Tóc Tiên, Noo Phước Thịnh, Đông Nhi and season 1 winning coach, Thu Minh. Former host of The X Factor Vietnam, Nguyên Khang will become the show's new host, replacing Phan Anh, while singer Tim will serve as the media backstage correspondent throughout the season.

The advisors for each team at the battles are: Mỹ Linh (season 2 coach) for team Tóc Tiên, music producer Khắc Hưng and singer Trung Quân for team Thu Minh, Phương Thanh for team Noo and Thanh Hà for team Đông Nhi. Thanh Hà continued working with team Đông Nhi for the Knockouts, while Siu Black (former Vietnam Idol judge), Hoài Sa (season 3 advisor) and Hồ Ngọc Hà (season 1 coach) served as advisors for team Tóc Tiên, Thu Minh and Noo for the Knockouts, respectively.

Teams
Color key

Blind auditions

Episode 1 (12 February)

Episode 2 (19 February)

Episode 3 (26 February)

Episode 4 (5 March)

The Battles
The battle rounds determine which contestant from each team is qualified for the Knockouts. Two (or three) contestants within a team are paired together to sing one song, but only one contestant is chosen for the live shows. There are no "steal" this season, but after the Battles are concluded, each coach can bring back an eliminated contestant from their own team as a coach-comeback artist and compete in the Knockouts. After the Battles, each team will have 6 artists.

Color key:

The Knockouts
This season, the knockouts is brought back after being scrapped in season 3. After the Battle Round, each coach will have 6 contestants for the Knockouts and they will pair 2 artists for a "Knockouts". Each contestant will sing a song of their own choice, and their respective coach will decide the winner of that Knockouts. In addition, each coach is allowed to "steal" one losing contestant from another coach's team. Contestants who either won the Knockouts or being stolen by another coach are qualified for the Live Shows. After the Knockouts, each team will has 4 contestants.

Color key:

Playoffs
Different from the previous 3 seasons, in this season, only the finals show is recorded live, whereas all the playoffs round are pre-recorded. The result are voted on in real-time by audience attending the show in the stadium. The rules are still similar to the past 3 seasons, which one (or two) artists received the most public vote will automatically advance to the next round, the coaches then choose one artist from their team to move on to the next round and the other team member is sent home. In addition, the "Wildcard" twist, which appeared on many Vietnamese shows like The X Factor Vietnam, Sing My Song Vietnam, The Face Vietnam and The Voice Kids is brought in, where audience can vote for an artist who was previously eliminated before the final to come back and compete in the live finals on the website SaoStar.vn.

Color key:

Week 1 and 2 (April 30 & May 7, 2017)

Week 3 (May 14, 2017)

Week 4 (May 21, 2017): Semifinals 
Just like the past 3 seasons, in this round, one artist in each team with the highest combined percentage from the public's vote and their coach's point is qualified for the final, while the other act is sent home but can be brought back via Wildcard.

On Thursday, May 25, 2017, Ngô Anh Đạt from team Noo Phước Thịnh was officially announced as the Wildcard act and will return for the Live Finals after receiving the most votes from the audience in the "Wildcard" twist. However, since the Live Finals was recorded before the announcement was made, Ngô Anh Đạt will only perform his Finalist's single as well as the duet with his coach, Noo Phước Thịnh in the Grand Finale show, and his performances are counted as competition performances.

Week 5 and 6 (May 28, 2017 & June 4, 2017): The Finals 
Just like season 3, the finals is a two-night episode. Night 1 featured the top 4's solo performances as well as their duets with guest performers and was pre-recorded, while Night 2 (The Grand Finale) featured the finalist (including the Wildcard artist)'s final songs as well as duets with their coaches and was broadcast live. The voting windows were opened from the end of Night 1 to the end of the last competition performance of Night 2.

Elimination chart

Overall

Artist's info

Result details

Team
Color key
Artist's info

Result details

Contestants who appeared on previous shows or seasons
 Đặng Tuấn Phong, Nguyễn Ngọc Duy and Phan Tuấn Anh competed on season 7 of Vietnam Idol and finished in top 12, top 16 and top 33, respectively.
 Thái Bảo Trâm competed on season 3 of The Voice of Vietnam and reached the quarterfinals (Top 12).
 Phan Thị Thanh Nga was on The Winner Is... but was eliminated at the battles. She was also placed second on Tiếng ca học đường 2011.
 Hiền Hồ competed on season 2 of The X Factor Vietnam and was eliminated at the Four-chair Challenge stage.
 Lương Minh Trí competed on [[The Voice of Vietnam (season 1)|season 1 of The Voice of Vietnam]] and joined team Trần Lập, but was defeated in the battle by Nguyễn Kiên Giang, a finalist of that season.
 Phạm Chí Huy placed 12th on season 2 of The X Factor Vietnam. 
 Nguyễn Ngọc Phát competed on season 2 of The X Factor Vietnam'' as part of the band Fire. The group was eliminated at the Judge's House round.

References

1
2017 Vietnamese television seasons
2010s Vietnamese television series